Vasilishki (Vasilishok) is an urban settlement in Shchuchyn District, Grodno Region,  Belarus, the administrative center of Vasilishki Selsoviet.

History
Within the Grand Duchy of Lithuania, Vasilishki was part of Vilnius Voivodeship. In 1795, the town was acquired by the Russian Empire as a result of the Third Partition of Poland.

From 1919 until 1929, Vasilishki (Wasiliszki) was part of Lida County and from 1929 until 1939 of Szczuczyn County of  the Nowogródek Voivodeship of the Second Polish Republic. Before World War II, more than 80% of the 2,500 inhabitants of the town were Jews.

In September 1939, Vasilishki was occupied by the Red Army and, on 14 November 1939, incorporated into the Byelorussian SSR.

Vasilishki was occupied by Nazi Germany from June 1941 until 12 July 1944 and administered as a part of Generalbezirk Weißruthenien of Reichskommissariat Ostland. In December 1941, a ghetto was established where Jews from the neighboring villages of Zaboloc and Sobakintse were also kept imprisoned. Jews were forced to perform hard labor. On May 10, 1942, the Germans, assisted by the Lithuanian police, made a selection of the Jews in the central square. Between 1,800 and 2,200 Jews were shot in the Jewish cemetery over the course of 2 days, where pits had been dug in advance. The rest of the Jews, around 200 people, were transferred to different ghettos, among them the Lida ghetto. A certain number of Jews survived by escaping to the forest.

See also
Staryya Vasilishki

References

Agrotowns in Belarus
Holocaust locations in Belarus
Jewish Belarusian history
Lidsky Uyezd
Nowogródek Voivodeship (1919–1939)
Populated places in Grodno Region
Shchuchyn District
Vilnius Voivodeship